Ubiquitin-like, containing PHD and RING finger domains, 1, also known as UHRF1, is a protein which in humans is encoded by the UHRF1 gene.

Function 

This gene encodes a member of a subfamily of RING-finger type E3 ubiquitin ligases. The protein binds to hemi-methylated DNA during S-phase and recruits the main DNA methyltransferase protein, DNMT1, to regulate chromatin structure and gene expression. Its expression peaks at late G1 phase and continues during G2 and M phases of the cell cycle. It plays a major role in the G1/S transition, and functions in the p53-dependent DNA damage checkpoint. Multiple transcript variants encoding different isoforms have been found for this gene. It was originally identified as a direct regulator of topoisomerase 2a, but this has subsequently been disproven.  Uhrf1 has been extensively studied in vivo using zebrafish.

Clinical significance 

UHRF1 has recently been identified as a novel oncogene in hepatocellular carcinoma, the primary type of liver cancer.

References

Further reading